Cieutat is a commune in the Hautes-Pyrénées department in south-western France.

Its name comes from the Latin word civitas because in the Early Middle Ages it was the capital of the former French province of Bigorre.

See also
Communes of the Hautes-Pyrénées department

References

Communes of Hautes-Pyrénées